The 1961 Labour Party deputy leadership election took place on 12 November 1961, after sitting deputy leader George Brown was challenged by Barbara Castle, who became the first woman to run for either leader or deputy leader of the Labour Party.

Candidates
 George Brown, incumbent Deputy Leader of the Labour Party, Member of Parliament for Belper
 Barbara Castle, Member of Parliament for Blackburn

Results

Sources
http://privatewww.essex.ac.uk/~tquinn/labour_party_deputy.htm

See also
1961 Labour Party leadership election

1961
Labour Party deputy leadership election
Labour Party deputy leadership election
Labour Party deputy leadership election